Kopaonik ski resort or Kopaonik ski center is a mountain resort and the largest center of winter tourism in Serbia. Located on the slopes of Kopaonik Mountain, it is mainly a destination for skiing and snowboarding, but also offers various other activities like tennis. In the area, there are several hotels and hostels, cafes, bars and night clubs.

History
Kopaonik ski resort was established in 1964, when the first chairlift was opened. In 1981, Kopaonik Mountain was proclaimed a national park of Serbia. In the same year, the International Ski Federation (FIS) recognized ski resort as an international ski center.

In 1999, it was bombed several times as the Serbian Armed Forces military base is located nearby.

Features
Among other features, it has night skiing run and artificial snow system covering most of the resort.

Kopaonik has mild winters with high levels of snowfall, and on average about 200 sunny days annually with 160 days covered with snow. 

Kopaonik ski resort is being considered as one of the best ski resorts in South East Europe, with outstanding beginner and lower-intermediate terrain for skiers.

Festivals
There is an annual music festival "Big Snow" held from 23 to 29 March in the area of ski resort. The festival gathers international reggae, jazz and electronic music performers.

The ski resort has a "Snow Park" for extreme skiers and snowboarders. The park has expanses of grassland, forests composed of a variety of tree species, beauty spots, and river gorges. The snow blanket lasts a long time on this mountain and there are favorable conditions for the expansion of winter tourism there.

Transportation
Kopaonik ski resort is well-connected with the main transport routes in Serbia. The recently open Morava Airport near Kraljevo is much closer to this ski resort (102 km, 63 mi, approximately, hour-and-half-drive by Ibar highway). However, it is only in its early development phase, although it is expected that this aerodrome will serve as the main hub for Kopaonik in the future.

Gallery

See also
 Tourism in Serbia

References

External links

 
 Ski resort Kopaonik at skiresort.info
 Kopaonik ski resort at skijalistasrbije.rs
 Ski staze i žičare at infokop.net

Ski areas and resorts in Serbia
Kopaonik